EuroNanoForum (ENF) nanotechnology conferences are organised within the framework of national presidencies of the European Council and supported by the European Union, Directorate-General for Research and Innovation.

The first conference EuroNanoForum 2003, held in Trieste during the Italian Presidency, enabled the European Commission to present the key elements for an integrated and responsible approach and a common strategy for the future on nanotechnology research. It brought to the issue of a Commission Communication in 2004, and to the preparation of an Action Plan for Europe for the period 2005–2009.

The second conference EuroNanoForum 2005 took place in Edinburgh was focused on "Nanotechnology and the Health of the EU Citizen in 2020". The aim of the conference was to promote developments in nanotechnology that are leading to innovative solutions for health and healthcare in Europe as part of an integrated and responsible approach presented in Trieste.

The third conference EuroNanoForum 2007 took place in Düsseldorf addressing "Nanotechnology in industrial applications". The aim of the conference was to promote on for the nanotechnology transfer from research into industrial production processes, products and applications that can improve the competitiveness of European industry.

EuroNanoForum 2009 conference, held in Prague within the frame of the Czech presidency, addressed "Nanotechnology for sustainable economy". The focus was to grow opportunity and responsibility to leveraging nanotechnology to reduce pollution, conserve resources and, ultimately, build a "clean" environmentally sustainable economy as well as to address concerns for the safe and responsible development of nanotechnology.

EuroNanoForum 2011 took place in Budapest during Hungarian EU Presidency. The event was focused on " Leading the Nanotechnology ERA" and explored how nanotechnology could contribute to sustainable solutions for Grand Challenges faced by European society and businesses in several areas, such as global warming, tightening supplies of energy, water and food, ageing societies, public health, pandemics and security with the overarching challenge of turning Europe into an eco-efficient economy.

The EuroNanoForum  was held for the 6th time in June 2013 in Dublin, Ireland. The event was hosted under the auspices of the Irish Presidency of the Council of the European Union. It was dedicated to "Nanotechnology Innovation: From research to commercialisation – the bridge to  Horizon2020". The speakers initiated a thriving discussion about the future of nanotechnology, its economic and technological impact on European growth and the commercialisation challenges of nanoproducts. Speakers agreed that it requires the understanding of industrial needs, focused R&D and suitable funding instruments, as well as the identification of areas where nanotechnology is most likely to have impact. One of the event highlights was a video message by U2’s guitarist, David Howell Evans, better known as The Edge, to all delegates asking them to live the dreams to change the world for the better, also in the world of science.

The EuroNanoForum 2015 "Nanotechnology for European competitiveness" took place in Riga in June 2015, during the Latvian Presidency of the Council of the European Union. It is Europe's largest networking conference on nanotechnologies and advanced materials science, innovations and business.

The EuroNanoForum 2017 took place in Valletta in June 2017, during the Maltese Presidency of the Council of the European Union. It was dedicated to "Strengthening the competitiveness of European manufacturing industries through nano and advanced materials technologies and open innovation".

The next event is planned to take place in the first semester of 2019 in Bucharest during the Romanian Presidency of the Council of the European Union.

The EuroNanoForum 2021 happened online in May 2021, during the Portuguese Presidency of the Council of the European Union. It addressed the role of nano-enabled technologies and industries in the transformation towards EU prosperity. The event brought forward the role of R&I, as well as the opportunities offered by the European Union next Framework Programme: Horizon Europe. 

The EuroNanoForum 2023  will take place in Lund, Sweden on the 11-13 June 2023, during the Swedish Presidency of the council of the European Union. The EuroNanoForum 2023 is conference of major strategic nature that is focused on identifying policy options and priorities and on planning future actions regarding European activities on nanoscience and -technology, advanced materials, innovation, sustainability, circular economy as well as materials and energy sovereignty.

References

See also
 EuroNanoForum 2009
 EuroNanoForum 2011
 EuroNanoForum 2021
 EuroNanoForum 2023

Nanotechnology institutions
International conferences
 Recurring events established in 2003